Strathcona-Tweedsmuir School is a private university prep school in Okotoks, Alberta, Canada.  It has students in Grades K to 12, with its Grade 12 provincial exam scores consistently highly ranked. Strathcona-Tweedsmuir is Southern Alberta's first full IB World School, and Alberta's only independent school authorized to deliver IB Programmes in Grades 1 through 12. Strathcona-Tweedsmuir School places well in the annual Fraser Institute rankings. STS is also an active participant in the CESI (Canadian Educational Standards Institute) program, and often volunteers teachers for inter-school evaluatory interaction. STS is also a member of Round Square and the Canadian Accredited Independent Schools (CAIS).

History
The school opened in September 1971 as the result of the amalgamation of two of Calgary's oldest independent schools: Strathcona School for Boys (founded in 1929) and Tweedsmuir: An Academic School for Girls (founded in 1959). St. Hilda's School (1889–1949) preceded Tweedsmuir School for Girls.

In 2003, seven students from the school were killed in an avalanche in British Columbia while on a skiing trip. The students were on a school ski trip on Mount Cheops near Revelstoke when the avalanche occurred. Out of the seventeen skiers involved in the avalanche, ten were rescued. Despite the incident, Strathcona Tweedsmuir School has not abandoned its outdoor education program, which is mandatory for students in grades 4–9 and optional for grade 10 students.

Notable alumni 
 Robert-Falcon Ouellette, CD (1995), Veteran and Indigenous Member of Parliament 
 Peter Lougheed – Former Premier of Alberta (attended Strathcona School for Boys, founding school of STS)
 Craig Adams (1995) - Stanley Cup winning National Hockey League player 
 Nicholas Graham (1976), Founder of Joe Boxer

References

External links
 
 Strathcona-Tweedsmuir School Profile By TopPrivateSchools.ca

High schools in Alberta
Elementary schools in Alberta
Private schools in Alberta
International Baccalaureate schools in Alberta
Educational institutions established in 1971
Round Square schools
Okotoks
1971 establishments in Alberta